A total of 229 lunar eclipses took place in the 20th century: 83 penumbral, 65 partial and 81 total.

See also: Lists of lunar eclipses, List of 19th-century lunar eclipses and List of 21st-century lunar eclipses

List 
Eclipses from 2001 to 2002 are included on the end to complete the final set.

References
This list was compiled with data calculated by Fred Espenak of NASA's GSFC.

 
Lunar eclipses
Lunar eclipses
Lunar eclipses by time